Albert, 12th Prince of Thurn and Taxis (Albert Maria Lamoral Miguel Johannes Gabriel Fürst von Thurn und Taxis, ; born 24 June 1983), is a German aristocrat, businessman, philosopher, and race car driver. He has been listed as the world's youngest billionaire many times since his father's death in 1990, first appearing on the list when he was age eight.

Biography

Family 
Through descent from King Miguel I of Portugal, Albert is related to several reigning hereditary heads of state in Europe. He also descends from the dynasties of Wittelsbach, Saxe-Coburg-Gotha, Braganza and the House of Habsburg-Lorraine. The House of Thurn und Taxis is a German family whose fortune derives from the appointment of an ancestor, Leonhard von Taxis, as hereditary postmaster general of the Holy Roman Empire in 1595. Albert's father preceded him as the head of this family, which has several branches. The family of Thurn und Taxis remains well known as owners of breweries and former builders of castles. The family seat is Saint Emmeram's Abbey.

His father, Johannes, 11th Prince of Thurn and Taxis, an internationally renowned boulevardier, died in 1990 when Albert was seven years old, leaving the young boy to inherit a US$3 billion fortune and US$500 million in debts. His mother, Gloria (née Countess von Schönburg-Glauchau), a popular media figure since marriage to his 53-year-old father as a 20-year-old, was instrumental in preserving the family fortune until Albert became of legal age to take over its management. He has two older sisters: Princess Maria Theresia and Princess Elisabeth.

Education
Thurn und Taxis completed his high school education in Rome and then, after his military service, he studied economics and theology at the University of Edinburgh. Prince Albert completed a doctorate in philosophy at the Pontifical University of Saint Thomas Aquinas (Angelicum) in 2022, defending a dissertation entitled: Rational Nature Or Wishful Thinking? Freedom & Rationality in Aquinas And Their Medieval Critique.

Media attention

In 2008 Albert was included as 11th on the list of the Forbes Magazine's List of The 20 Hottest Young Royals as compiled by Forbes magazine.

Motorsport
He is an enthusiastic racing driver, vice-champion (2007/2008) and champion (2010) of the German GT Championship ADAC GT Masters with the German Team Reiter Engineering.

He embarked on a career in rallying in 2009, competing in the European Rally Championship since 2016.

Titles, styles and honours

Titles and styles
Traditional:
 28 June 1983 14 December 1990: His Serene Highness Prince Albert of Thurn and Taxis
 14 December 1990 present: His Serene Highness the Prince of Thurn and Taxis

Dynastic honours
 Calabrian House of Bourbon-Two Sicilies: Knight Grand Cross of Justice of the Calabrian Two Sicilian Order of Saint George.

Racing record

Complete GT1 World Championship results

Complete World Rally Championship results

Complete World Rally Championship-3 results

References

External links

 Thurn and Taxis Family Homepage
 Richest Germans: Silver Spoon Baby^
 Homepage of Albert of Thurn und Taxis 

Businesspeople from Bavaria
German billionaires
21st-century German businesspeople
People from Regensburg
1983 births
Living people
German socialites
Princes of Thurn und Taxis
German Roman Catholics
German racing drivers
European Le Mans Series drivers
FIA GT1 World Championship drivers
Porsche Supercup drivers
Blancpain Endurance Series drivers
ADAC GT Masters drivers
European Rally Championship drivers
World Rally Championship drivers